Joseph-Théodore Deck (2 January 1823 – 15 May 1891) was a 19th-century French potter, an important figure in late 19th-century art pottery. Born in Guebwiller, Haut-Rhin, he began learning the trade in his early 20s, moving to Paris at age 24. In 1856 he established his own faience (earthenware) workshop, Joseph-Théodore Deck Ceramique Française, and began to experiment with styles from Islamic pottery, and in particular the Iznik style.
 

When Japonisme arrived in the 1870s he embraced this and other art pottery trends with enthusiasm, finally conquering the French establishment when he was made art director of Sèvres porcelain in 1887.  Several important figures from the next generation were trained by Deck, including Edmond Lachenal.

In the 1880s he also worked in the Chinese pottery tradition, also collaborating with Raphaël Collin, and other artists of the time. He died in Paris.  In 1887 he published a treatise under the title La Faïence, which is available in facsimile online.

Gallery

Sources

Ceramics Today, Théodore Deck and the Islamic Style 
CBS Resource Library, Théodore Deck

Bibliography
Théodore Deck, La faïence, Quantin, Paris, 1887. 300 p., complete text online at  Gallica
À la Mémoire de Théodore Deck. Érection d'un Monument à Guebwiller (Alsace), sa ville natale, J. Dreyfus impr, Guebwiller?, 1911?
Jules-Antoine Castagnary, « Théodore Deck », in Revue Alsacienne, 1880
Antoinette Faÿ-Hallé, Françoise Fournière, Brigitte Grenier et al. (dir.), Théodore Deck ou L'éclat des émaux, 1823–1891 (exposition catalogue, Marseille, Centre de la Vieille Charité, 1994, organized by the Musée Grobet-Labadié), Musées de Marseille, Marseille, 1994, 
André Girodie, « Biographies alsaciennes : Théodore Deck », in Revue Alsacienne illustrée, 1903, vol. V
André Girodie, Un céramiste alsacien : Théodore Deck, Art & Industrie, Nancy, 1912
J. Loebnitz, Article nécrologique sur M. Théodore Deck, in La Céramique et la verrerie, 1891?
Sandor Kuthy, Albert Anker, faiences, en collaboration avec Théodore Deck, Marguerat, Lausanne, 1985
Alexandre Meichler (intro.), Théodore Deck : magicien du feu (1823–1891) (exposition catalogue, Guebwiller, City Hall, 1976), Alsatia, Guebwiller, 1976
Théodore Deck (catalogue de l'exposition au Musée Cantini, Marseille, 1980), Le Musée, Marseille, 1979?
Théodore Deck : la véranda des glycines, Musée du florival, Guebwiller, 1989
Théodore Deck : 1823–1891 (préface Charles Haby), Musée du Florival, Guebwiller, 1991,

External links

 Musée Théodore Deck, Théodore Deck Museum, City of Guebwiller, France
 Deck and the Islamic Style
 

1823 births
1891 deaths
French decorative artists
French ceramists
French potters
People from Guebwiller
Art pottery